The 1971–72 Eredivisie season was the 12th season of the Eredivisie, the top level of ice hockey in the Netherlands. Ten teams participated in the league, and the Tilburg Trappers won the championship. Three Belgian teams took part in the league this season.

Regular season

External links
Nederlandse IJshockey Bond

Neth
Eredivisie (ice hockey) seasons